Coryton is a surname, and may refer to:

Alec Coryton (1895–1981), senior RAF commander in World War II
Sir John Coryton, 1st Baronet (1621–1680), MP for Cornwall, Launceston and Callington
Sir John Coryton, 2nd Baronet (1648–1690), of the Coryton baronets, MP for Newport and Callington
Sir John Coryton, 4th Baronet (c.1690–1739), British landowner and politician 
Laura Coryton, British campaigner and feminist activist
Sarah Elizabeth Coryton, High Sheriff of Cornwall, UK
William Coryton (1580–1651), Cornish politician